Route nationale 19  (RN19) is a secondary, unpaved highway in Madagascar. The route runs from the city of  Mahajanga, a city on the north-east coast of the Madagascar to Maintirano.  It covers a distance of 523 km and is hardly practicable.

Selected locations on route (from north to south)
Mahajanga - (National Road 4)
Soalala
Mitsinjo
Katsepy
Besalampy
Maintirano - (National Road 8a)

See also
List of roads in Madagascar
Transport in Madagascar

References 

Roads in Madagascar
 Roads in Boeny
 Roads in Melaky